Dichelopa is a genus of moths belonging to the subfamily Tortricinae of the family Tortricidae.

Species

Dichelopa achranta Meyrick, 1910
Dichelopa amorpha Clarke, 1986
Dichelopa anthracodelta Clarke, 1971
Dichelopa argema Clarke, 1986
Dichelopa argoschista Meyrick, 1928
Dichelopa argosphena Meyrick, 1934
Dichelopa argyrospiloides Clarke, 1971
Dichelopa canitia Clarke, 1986
Dichelopa castanopis Meyrick, 1934
Dichelopa ceramocausta Meyrick, 1926
Dichelopa chionogramma Clarke, 1986
Dichelopa choleranthes Meyrick, 1928
Dichelopa cirrhodoris Meyrick, 1934
Dichelopa deltozancla Meyrick, 1926
Dichelopa dendrophila Clarke, 1971
Dichelopa dichroa Lower, 1901
Dichelopa dorsata Clarke, 1986
Dichelopa dryomorpha Meyrick, 1928
Dichelopa exulcerata Meyrick, 1926
Dichelopa flexura Clarke, 1986
Dichelopa fulvistrigata Meyrick, 1928
Dichelopa gnoma Clarke, 1986
Dichelopa hadrotes Clarke, 1986
Dichelopa harmodes Meyrick, 1928
Dichelopa honoranda Meyrick, 1926
Dichelopa iochorda Meyrick, 1926
Dichelopa loricata Meyrick, 1910
Dichelopa lupicinia Clarke, 1971
Dichelopa meligma Clarke, 1986
Dichelopa messalina Clarke, 1971
Dichelopa myopori Clarke, 1971
Dichelopa ochroma Clarke, 1986
Dichelopa orthiostyla Meyrick, 1934
Dichelopa pachydmeta Meyrick, 1928
Dichelopa panoplana Meyrick, 1881
Dichelopa paragnoma Clarke, 1986
Dichelopa peropaca Meyrick, 1928
Dichelopa phalaranthes Meyrick, 1934
Dichelopa platyxantha Clarke, 1986
Dichelopa porphyrophanes Meyrick, 1934
Dichelopa praestrigata Meyrick, 1928
Dichelopa pulcheria Clarke, 1971
Dichelopa pyrsogramma Meyrick, 1934
Dichelopa rhodographa Clarke, 1971
Dichelopa sabulosa Meyrick, 1910
Dichelopa sciota (Lower, 1916)
Dichelopa sericopis Meyrick, 1926
Dichelopa tarsodes Meyrick, 1910
Dichelopa vaccinii Clarke, 1971
Dichelopa zona Clarke, 1986

See also
List of Tortricidae genera

References

 , 1901, Trans. R. S. Austral. 25: 76. 
 , 2005, World Catalogue of Insects 5.

External links
tortricidae.com

 
Archipini
Tortricidae genera